Nate Moeller (born November 18, 1997) is an American professional stock car racing driver. He competes part-time in the ARCA Menards Series East, driving the No. 10/06 Ford Fusion for Wayne Peterson Racing.

Racing career

ARCA Menards Series East 
Moeller made his ARCA Menards Series East debut in 2022 at Five Flags Speedway. He originally qualified for the race in the No. 06 Ford Fusion for Wayne Peterson Racing, but after Benny Chastain wrecked in his No. 10 Toyota Camry for Fast Track Racing, Moeller ran the race for them. Moeller ran 2 laps before retiring due to a clutch issue.

Motorsports career results

ARCA Menards Series
(key) (Bold – Pole position awarded by qualifying time. Italics – Pole position earned by points standings or practice time. * – Most laps led.)

ARCA Menards Series East

References

External links 

Living people
ARCA Menards Series drivers
NASCAR drivers
Racing drivers from Ohio
1997 births